Bob, Bobby, Robbie, Rob, or Robert Boyd may refer to:

Arts and entertainment
 Robert Boyd (journalist) (1928–2019), American journalist, writer, and winner of the 1973 Pulitzer Prize for National Reporting
 Dice (rapper) (Robert Boyd, born 1970), American rapper
 Robert Boyd (director) (fl. 1980s–1990s), Canadian film director
 Robert Boyd (comics) (fl. 1990s), comics editor and critic on The Big Book Of
 Robbie Boyd, British singer and songwriter

Nobility
 Robert Boyd, 1st Lord Boyd (died c. 1482), Scottish statesman
 Robert Boyd, 4th Lord Boyd (died 1557/8), Scottish nobleman, grandson of the 1st Lord Boyd
 Robert Boyd, 5th Lord Boyd (c. 1517–1590), Scottish nobleman
 Robert Boyd, 7th Lord Boyd (1595–1628), Scottish noble
 Robert Boyd, 8th Lord Boyd (c. 1618–1640), Scottish noble and politician

Politics and law
 Robert Boyd (British Army officer) (1710–1794), British army officer and governor of Gibraltar
 Robert Boyd (civil servant) (fl. 1802–1812), British civil servant in British Ceylon
 Robert Boyd (Australian politician) (1885–1951), member of the Queensland Legislative Assembly

Science and medicine
 Robert Boyd (writer) (1803–1883), British physician and writer on diseases of the insane
 Robert F. Boyd (1858–1912), American physician and dentist
 Robert A. Boyd (1918–2006), Canadian electrical engineer; leader of the James Bay hydroelectric project
 Robert Boyd (physicist) (1922–2004), Scottish physicist and pioneer of British space science
 Robert Boyd (paediatrician) (born 1938), British paediatrician
 Robert Boyd (anthropologist) (born 1948), American anthropologist
 Robert W. Boyd (born 1948), American optical physicist

Sports
 Bob Boyd (footballer) (c. 1865–?), Scottish footballer
 Bob Boyd (baseball) (1919–2004), American first baseman in the Negro leagues and MLB
 Bob Boyd (American football) (1928–2009), American football end and wide receiver
 Bob Boyd (basketball) (1930–2015), American basketball coach
 Bobby Boyd (1937–2017), American football player for the Baltimore Colts
 Bob Boyd (ice hockey) (born 1951), Canadian ice hockey player
 Bob Boyd (golfer) (1955–2011), American golfer
 Rob Boyd (born 1966), Canadian alpine skier

Others
 Robert Boyd (university principal) (1578–1627), Principal of the University of Edinburgh
 Robert Napuʻuako Boyd (1863–1914), Hawaiian insurgent leader
 Robert Boyd (stenographer) (1870–?), Canadian inventor of Boyd's Syllabic Shorthand
 Robert Boyd (bishop) (1890–1958), Anglican bishop of Killaloe and Clonfert and of Derry and Raphoe
 Bobby Boyd, husband of fellow real estate agent Josh Flagg

Other uses
 Robert Boyd Publications, English publishing company

See also
 Robert Boyd Brazier (1916–1942), American naval officer